Selena Torres is an American politician. She is a Democrat representing the 3rd district in the Nevada State Assembly.

Education

Torres holds an A.A. in Spanish from the College of Southern Nevada and a B.A. in English Literature from the University of Nevada at Reno. She has an M.Ed. from the University of Nevada at Las Vegas.

Political career

In 2018, Torres ran for election to represent District 3 in the Nevada State Assembly, replacing Nelson Araujo, who was leaving the seat to run for Secretary of State. She won with 66.5% of the vote.

Torres sits on the following Assembly committees:
 Education
 Judiciary
 Legislative Operations and Elections

Electoral record

References

Living people
1995 births
21st-century American women politicians
Democratic Party members of the Nevada Assembly
College of Southern Nevada alumni
University of Nevada, Reno alumni
University of Nevada, Las Vegas alumni
Women state legislators in Nevada
Hispanic and Latino American teachers
Hispanic and Latino American state legislators in Nevada
Hispanic and Latino American women in politics
Politicians from Las Vegas
21st-century American politicians